Walter Schlee, born 15 December 1894 in Kępno, Posen province, Germany; died 5 February 1964 in Lugano, Switzerland, was a German screenwriter. The Jewish Schlee left German following the Nazi Party's takeover of 1933. He then worked in the Netherlands along with other exiles such as Max Ophuls.

Selected filmography
 The Blonde Nightingale (1930)
 Dangers of the Engagement Period (1930)
 Pension Schöller (1930)
 Twice Married (1930)
 The Unfaithful Eckehart (1931)
 Storm in a Water Glass (1931)
 Such a Greyhound (1931)
 Ash Wednesday (1931)
 The True Jacob (1931)
 The Stranger (1931)
 Wibbel the Tailor (1931)
 The Testament of Cornelius Gulden (1932)
 The Escape to Nice (1932)
 A Night in Paradise (1932)
 The Big Bluff (1933)
 The Sandwich Girl (1933)
 Tell Me Who You Are (1933)
 Marion, That's Not Nice (1933)
 Een Zomerzotheid (1935)
 Suikerfreule (1935)
 Het Mysterie van de Mondscheinsonate (1936)
 The Trouble With Money (1936)

References

Bibliography
 Ernest Mathijs. The Cinema of the Low Countries. Wallflower Press, 2004.

External links

German male screenwriters
Jewish emigrants from Nazi Germany to the Netherlands
People from Kępno County
1894 births
1964 deaths
20th-century German screenwriters